Hinthada District (formerly Henzada District) is a district of Ayeyarwady Division, Myanmar.

Townships
The district contains the following townships:
Hinthada Township
Zalun Township
Lemyethna Township (Laymyethna)

Districts of Myanmar
Ayeyarwady Region